A giant pair of shoes made in Marikina, Philippines is a city attraction and was known for being the world's largest shoes according to Guinness World Records. The city nicknamed "Shoe Capital of the Philippines" is known for its shoe-making industry.

Conception
The Marikina city government, known for its shoe-making industry, under Mayor Marides Fernando is responsible for the creation of two giant shoes. The crafting of the shoes were part of a bid to break the Guinness World Records on the "largest shoes in the world" as well as an attempt to boost the city's reputation in shoe-making globally.

Crafting and dimensions

Marikina's giant shoes were made by Colossal Footwear, a 9-shoemaker team consisting of Norman Arada, Florinio de Asis, Daniel Cotter, Noel Cox, Arman Javier, Cesar Paz, Arthur Rivera, Emmanuel Samson, and Romel Villareal. They decided to make a pair of men's shoes for stability and were hesitant of making high-heeled women's shoes. Bulacan-based The Valenzuela Tannery was responsible for supplying the natural leather used for the making of the giant shoes. The shoes, which has a size of 753 according to French shoe size standards, took 77 days of crafting to be finished. The shoes costed  (US$23,076) and each has a dimension of  The footwear are Oxford shoes.

Unveiling and subsequent display
The giant shoes of Marikina were formally unveiled in October 2002.

The footwear was subsequently displayed at the Marikina Sports Park and later at the Marikina Shoe Gallery at the Riverbank Mall until the latter's closure in late 2020. The shoes are distinct from the giant shoes which were displayed on a barge in the middle of the Marikina River.

By 2013, the Marikina giant shoes has already lost its Guinness World Records distinction. In April 2013, Hong Kong shoe distributor Electric Sekki manufactured a  replica of a Superga 2750 shoe.

References

Philippine footwear
2002 clothing
Tourist attractions in Metro Manila
Marikina
2002 in fashion
Individual garments